Anna Hastings: The Story of a Washington Newspaperperson is a 1977 political novel by Allen Drury which follows the titular reporter as she climbs her way to the top of the Washington media elite. It is set in a different fictional timeline from Drury's 1959 novel Advise and Consent, which earned him a Pulitzer Prize for Fiction.

Plot summary
Anna Kowalczek arrived on Capitol Hill the very day America entered World War II. She infiltrated the exclusively male domains of politics and journalism by hiding her intelligence and drive behind a façade of cheerful, irreverent innocence—playing the role men expected of bright, pretty girls in 1941. Thirty-five years later, Anna Hastings, widow of Texas Senator Gordon Hastings, is an influential columnist, powerful television personality, major political figure, publisher of one of the most respected newspapers in the country, and master of a media empire she ruled with a whim of iron.

Anna Hastings is the story of her public and personal struggles as she climbs her way from obscurity to legend, set against the backdrop of Washington during the tumultuous years of World War, Cold War, the Civil Rights Movement, and the emergence of feminism as a distinct political force. Drawing on his years reporting on the Senate, Allen Drury again presents an "insider's view" of both the Senate and the Washington Press Corps during these decades of rapid social and political change.

Reception
In 2009,  The Wall Street Journal published a retrospective by National Public Radio commentator Scott Simon in which he called Anna Hastings "both an unsparing and sympathetic portrait of a newspaperwoman when they were rare and often maligned." John Barkham wrote in The Victoria Advocate in 1977:

Inevitably there were some observers who assumed similarities between Anna Hastings and Katharine Graham, publisher of The Washington Post. This supposition resurfaces occasionally, as when Roger Kaplan, writing for the Policy Review in 1999, called Anna Hastings a "transparent attack," adding:

However, there is no evidence Graham herself saw any such similarities or perceived the novel as critical of herself or her newspaper. Like most reviewers at the time, Barkham noted that "Washington is in fact graced by an influential woman newspaper publisher, but she is quite unlike Anna. Drury in fact makes a point of introducing her and her paper into his narrative." The two publishers, real and fictional, would again be referenced in Drury's 1983 novel Decision.

Though Allen Drury portrayed equal rights for all Americans, including women, as an essential political goal in all of his novels, he was of a generation that came of age in the 1930s and his language can sound condescending to modern sensibilities. John Maxwell Hamilton reflected this perception when he called Anna Hastings "mean spirited about what was then budding feminism" in his 2000 book Casanova Was a Book Lover. He quoted Allen Drury's dedication of Anna Hastings as illustrative of his point:

SeriesAnna Hastings takes place in a separate timeline from the Advise and Consent series, and was followed in 1979 by Mark Coffin, U.S.S., Drury's next modern political novel. Though Hastings does not appear in this novel, she is a minor character in The Hill of Summer (1981) and The Roads of Earth (1984), the two sequels to Mark Coffin, U.S.S.''.

References

External links
 
 

1977 American novels
American political novels
Novels about journalists
Novels by Allen Drury
Novels set in Washington, D.C.